United States v. Schooner Peggy, 5 U.S. (1 Cranch) 103 (1801), was a United States Supreme Court case. It was one of a series of cases resolving disputes over ships captured during the undeclared Quasi-War between the United States and France from 1798 to 1800.  The vessel was ordered returned to France.

Background of the case
From 1798 to 1800 the United States and France were engaged in many hostile Naval engagements.  According to the law at the time an enemy vessel could be captured during time of war and then subject to seizure, a legal process through which the vessel was determined to be property of the capturing party.  At the conclusion of the undeclared war with France a treaty was ratified that stated in part: 
 The treaty was thus retroactive to all vessels that had been captured but for which their seizure was not yet final.

David Jewett was authorized as commander of the Trumbull to capture any vessel sailing under the flag of France.  On April 24, 1800, it came upon the French schooner Peggy and captured it.  The Peggy was returned to Connecticut where the local courts ruled her a prize of war in September 1800.  The owners of the Peggy appealed to the Supreme Court for her return.

The decision
The court ruled that the treaty was applicable as law and should apply retroactively to all seized vessels whose sentence was not yet final.  Since the seizure of the vessel was on appeal to the Supreme Court at the time the treaty was ratified, the seizure was not final.  The vessel was ordered to be returned to France.

The case continues to be one in a long line of sometimes inconsistent precedents in civil retroactivity analysis.

See also
 Civil forfeiture
 List of United States Supreme Court cases, volume 5
 Maritime Law
 Laws of War
 Retroactive legislation
 Nebraska v. One 1970 2-Door Sedan Rambler (Gremlin)
 United States v. 422 Casks of Wine

Notes and references

External links
 

United States civil forfeiture case law
United States Supreme Court cases
United States Supreme Court cases of the Marshall Court
1801 in United States case law
Quasi-War
United States Treaty Clause case law